Biete Amanuel is an underground Orthodox monolith rock-cut church located in Lalibela, Ethiopia. The edifice was built during the Kingdom of Axum. It is part of UNESCO World Heritage Site at Lalibela. Biete Amanuel (House of Emmanuel) is possibly the former royal chapel.

References 

Rock-Hewn Churches, Lalibela